The Akwa Ibom State Ministry of Health is the state government ministry, charged with the responsibility to plan, devise and implement the state policies on Health.  The ministry was formed as an MDA (Ministries, Departments, and Agencies), in 1987, with the creation of the Nigerian state of Akwa Ibom.  It has 7 divisions, or Directorates, Each having their own distinct responsibilities to the Ministry and the Government.  They are the Directorate of Nursing services, Directorate of Medical Services, Directorate of Pharmaceutical Services, Directorate of Public Health Services, Directorate of Planning, Research, and Statistics, Directorate of Accounts and Finance, and the Directorate of Administration/Supplies.

References 

Government ministries of Akwa Ibom State
Akwa Ibom